Tasov is a municipality and village in Hodonín District in the South Moravian Region of the Czech Republic. It has about 500 inhabitants.

History
The first written mention of Tasov is from 1217.

References

Villages in Hodonín District